Pallacanestro Brescia  S.p.A., known for sponsorship reasons as Germani Brescia, is an Italian professional basketball team based in Brescia, Lombardy. Founded in 2009, the team plays in the Lega Basket Serie A (LBA) since the 2016–17 season and the EuroCup since the 2018–19 season, with home games played at the PalaLeonessa.

History
In 2016, Brescia Leonessa won the Serie A2 League after beating Fortitudo Bologna at game 5 of the league's playoffs, and returns in the highest-tier of the Italian basketball league system after 28 years.

In 2018, Basket Brescia reached the final of the Italian Cup. The team lost 69–67, as Fiat Torino went on to win its first Cup ever. The following season, the team would play in the EuroCup, which would be its European debut. Brescia played its first European match ever at home against Monaco, losing 68–80. It got its first win in the EuroCup on 24 October 2018, as Brescia won 69–61 over KK Crvena zvezda. In July 2020 club changed its name from Basket Brescia to "Pallacanestro Brescia", but sponsor name "Germani" remained.

Arena
The club plays its home games in the PalaGeorge, located in Montichiari, which seats 5,500 spectators.

On 16 January 2017 there was the official presentation of the project for the new arena located in Brescia. It will be called PalaLeonessa. The project consists of a renovation and an extension of the old PalaEIB, with the increase of capacity up to 5,200. Construction works will end in 2018. From September 2018, the PalaLeonessa will be home arena for the club for LBA and EuroCup matches.

Season by season

Players

Current roster

Depth chart

Notable players

Honours
Serie A2 Basket
Champions (1): 2015–16
 Italian Cup
 Runners-up (1): 2018

Sponsorship names

Through the years, due to sponsorship deals, it has been also known as:
Centrale del Latte di Brescia (2009–2016)
Germani Trasporti (2016–present) (Since 2018 only in LBA)
FAP Investments (2018–present) (EuroCup)

Kit

Manufacturer

References

External links
Official website 

2009 establishments in Italy
Basketball teams established in 2009
Basketball teams in Lombardy